Margaret "Peggy" Stern (born September 22, 1948, Philadelphia, Pennsylvania) is an American jazz pianist and synthesizer player.

Career
Stern studied piano at the Eastman School of Music, receiving her bachelor's degree in 1968, then attended the New England Conservatory of Music (1968–70). She studied classical music, and her interest in improvisation was inspired by experience with figured bass realizations in early music.

In the 1980s she performed as a jazz musician in an octet with Richie Cole and Julian Priester. She was also in R&B and Latin music bands. During the 1990s she worked with Lee Konitz and Vic Juris and recorded albums with her band. Stern taught at the Cornish Institute in Seattle from 1981 to 1989 and at State University of New York at Purchase from 1991 to 1997.

In 2004 Stern started the Wall Street Jazz Festival in Kingston, New York. The festival has included Allison Miller, Claire Daly, Dena DeRose, Erica Lindsay, Ingrid Jensen, Jamie Baum, Jay Clayton, Jenny Scheinman, Lee Shaw, Marilyn Crispell, Natalie Cressman, Roberta Piket, Sheila Jordan, Sheryl Bailey, Sue Terry, and Virginia Mayhew.

Discography
 City Hawk (BAM, 1985)
 Lunasea with Lee Konitz(Soul Note, 1992) 
 The Jobim Collection with Lee Konitz (Philology, 1993)
 Pleiades (Philology, 1994)
 Room Enough (Koch, 1997)
 The Fuchsia with Thomas Chapin (Koch, 1997)
 Actual Size (Koch, 2000)
 Estrella Trio (Estrella, 2006)
 The Art of the Duo with Sweet Sue Terry (CDBaby, 2010)
 Z Octet (Estrella, 2015)

References
Gary W. Kennedy, "Peggy Stern". Grove Jazz online.

American jazz pianists
Jazz musicians from Pennsylvania
Living people
1948 births
20th-century American pianists
20th-century American women pianists
21st-century American pianists
21st-century American women pianists